Four ships of the United States Navy have borne the name Davis. The first three were named in honor of Admiral Charles H. Davis. The fourth, DD-937, was named for Commander George F. Davis.

 , a torpedo boat, launched 1898, sold for scrap 1920

See also

United States Navy ship names